Live in Japan is the second live album by Mexican guitar duo Rodrigo y Gabriela. It was released on independent label Rubyworks Records on October 17 and October 20 in Ireland and the UK, respectively. The album captures Rodrigo & Gabriela making their live Japanese debut, at Tokyo’s Duo club on March 30, 2008.

Track listing

Personnel
Rodrigo y Gabriela
Rodrigo Sánchez – acoustic guitar
Gabriela Quintero – acoustic guitar

Production
Produced by Rodrigo y Gabriela
Engineered by Yujiro Saito
Mixed by Naoto Tanemura
Mastered by Mitsuyasu Abe
Executive producers – Sach Tsuchiya and Masami Yamamoto
Product manager – Koichi Kanematsu
Front cover design by Jam Suzuki
Front cover and booklet photo by Ryota Mori
Back cover photo by Tina Korhonen

References

Rodrigo y Gabriela albums
2008 live albums